Renée Blondeau (10 May 1918 – 15 May 1969) was a French swimmer. She competed in the women's 100 metre freestyle at the 1936 Summer Olympics.

References

External links
 

1918 births
1969 deaths
Olympic swimmers of France
Swimmers at the 1936 Summer Olympics
Place of birth missing
French female freestyle swimmers
20th-century French women